The 2011–12 Tennessee Volunteers basketball team represented the University of Tennessee in the 2011–12 season. The team was a member of the Southeastern Conference and played its home games at Thompson-Boling Arena. This was the first season for Cuonzo Martin as the Volunteers' head coach. Martin left Missouri State to take over for former head coach Bruce Pearl who was fired on March 21, 2011 for lying to NCAA investigators about recruiting violations.

Roster

Class of 2011 Signees

Schedule

|-
!colspan=9| Exhibition

|-
!colspan=9| Non-Conference Regular Season

|-
!colspan=9| SEC Regular Season

|-
!colspan=9| 2012 SEC tournament

|-
!colspan=9|2012 NIT

|-
| colspan="8" | *Non-Conference Game. Rankings from AP poll. All times are in Eastern Time.  Tournament seedings in parenthesis.  
|}

References

Tennessee
Tennessee Volunteers basketball seasons
Tennessee
Tennessee Volunteers basketball
Tennessee Volunteers basketball